Frank Morse is an American politician served as a member of the Oregon State Senate for the 8th district from 2003 until 2012. He was first elected in 2002, defeating Democrat Barbara Ross, and was re-elected in 2006 and 2010. In September 2012, Morse resigned his office, stating that it was "time for new energy" in the position.

Early life and education 
Frank Morse was born and raised in Lebanon, Oregon. He graduated from Lebanon High School in 1961, and went on to earn degrees from Oregon State University and Bushnell University.

Career

Business 
Morse has been part of the Morse Bros. family business since 1972, serving in the following positions: Albany Division Manager, Vice President of Operations, Executive Vice President, President, and Chairman. When Morse Bros. merged with MDU Resources Group, Frank continued as President until his retirement in 2000. He moved on to a new business, Environ-Metal Inc., and currently chairs its board.

Morse has also headed the boards of the Albany Chamber of Commerce, Cascade Employers Association, Oregon Concrete and Aggregate Producers Association, Greater Pacific Bank, Samaritan Albany General Hospital Board, Samaritan Health Services Board, and Northwest Christian College Trustees.

He has also served on the boards of the Albany Boys and Girls Club, the Vern Catt McDowell Corporation, Western Security Bank, OSU Family Business Council, Cockerline Foundation, and Albany Boys and Girls Club Foundation.

Politics 
Morse was first elected to the Oregon State Senate in 2002, defeating Democrat Barbara Ross, a three-term member of the Oregon House of Representatives who had lost her seat due to the term limits then in effect. It was Morse's first run for political office. The race was one of six that year that were considered likely to affect party control of the Oregon Legislative Assembly, and that attracted hundreds of thousands of dollars in contributions. Ross and Morse raised a total of about $500,000, and were noted for eschewing negative advertising for most of the campaign.

Morse was reelected in 2006, defeating Democrat Mario Magana with 59% of the vote. He has served on the Joint Ways and Means Committee, the Emergency Board, the Public Commission on the Legislature, the Joint Information and Management Technology Committee, the Senate General Government Committee, and the Oregon Innovation and Technology Council.

In 2006, Morse delivered a speech on globalization, and specifically on Thomas Friedman's book The World Is Flat, to the Friends of the Albany Public Library. He was criticized for purchasing research for the speech from a firm in India that was cited as a primary source in Friedman's book.

In 2007, Morse proposed a comprehensive reform to Oregon's tax system, along with Democratic Senators Ben Westlund, Ryan Deckert, and Kurt Schrader. The plan, which would have included a sales tax, promised to raise more revenue while costing individual Oregon taxpayers less. It would have required a three-fifths supermajority in both houses of the Oregon Legislative Assembly. It did not pass.

The environmental Oregon League of Conservation Voters gave Morse's Senate votes a score of 0% in 2003, 17% in 2005, and 58% in 2007.

In 2008, the Oregon Legislative Assembly held an experimental session, to explore the possibility of holding annual sessions as a regular practice. Such a change would require an amendment to the Oregon Constitution. Senator Morse noted some successes of the experimental session, but advised that it would be more effective to shorten regular sessions in odd-numbered years, and lengthen supplemental sessions, such that sessions are closer in length.

Morse resigned halfway through his third term, and the county commissioners in his district appointed Betsy Close as his successor.

Personal life 
He and his wife, Linda, whom he married in 1965, have lived in Albany since 1972. They have two children and six grandchildren. They have attended First Christian Church for over 30 years. Morse has chaired the church's board and has served as an elder.

Awards 
Morse has received the OSU Family Business Award, OCCAPA Rocky Award, the Associated Oregon Industries Business Leader of the Year Award, and an honorary Doctor of Humanities Degree from Northwest Christian College.

See also
Politics of Oregon

References

External links 
 Campaign web site (dormant since 2010)

Republican Party Oregon state senators
Businesspeople from Oregon
People from Albany, Oregon
Oregon State University alumni
Living people
People from Lebanon, Oregon
Bushnell University alumni
21st-century American politicians
Year of birth missing (living people)